Wednesday, May 9  is a 2015 Iranian drama film directed by Vahid Jalilvand in his feature debut. It was shown in the Horizons section of the 72nd Venice International Film Festival where it won the FIPRESCI Award.

Cast
 Niki Karimi
Amir Aghaei
Afarin Oveysi
 Shahrokh Forootanian
Vahid Jalilvand
Saeed Dakh
Kataneh Afsharinezhad
Sahar Ahmadpur
Milad Yazdani
Borzu Arjmand

Reception

Critical response
On review aggregator website Rotten Tomatoes, the film holds an approval rating of 100% based on 7 reviews, and an average rating of 7.8/10.

References

External links
 
 

2015 films
2015 drama films
2015 directorial debut films
Iranian drama films
2010s Persian-language films